Grant Shapps (born 14 September 1968) is a British politician serving as Secretary of State for Energy Security and Net Zero since February 2023. He previously served as Secretary of State for Transport in the Johnson government from 2019 to 2022, Home Secretary during the final six days of the Truss premiership in October 2022, and Secretary of State for Business, Energy and Industrial Strategy from October 2022 to February 2023. A member of the Conservative Party, he has been the Member of Parliament (MP) for Welwyn Hatfield since 2005.

Shapps was first elected to the House of Commons in 2005 general election, and was promoted to the Shadow Cabinet as Shadow Minister for Housing and Planning in 2007. Following David Cameron's appointment as Prime Minister in 2010, Shapps was appointed Minister of State for Housing and Local Government. In the 2012 cabinet reshuffle he was promoted to the Cabinet as Co-Chairman of the Conservative Party and Minister without Portfolio. In May 2015, he was demoted from the Cabinet, becoming Minister of State for International Development. In November 2015, he stood down from this post due to his handling of allegations of bullying within the Conservative Party.

After he supported Boris Johnson's 2019 Conservative leadership bid, when Johnson became Prime Minister, he appointed Shapps as Transport Secretary in July. Since Shapps assumed the role it has exercised greater influence than under his predecessors, with the effective nationalisation of the Northern Trains franchise, the Williams–Shapps Review to move from a rail franchise system to concessionary Great British Railways public body (from 2023), COVID-19 travel restrictions to and from the United Kingdom, and the Integrated Rail Plan published in 2021 which sets out the long-term strategy for rail in northern England and the Midlands. 

In September 2022, Johnson’s successor, Liz Truss dismissed Shapps as Transport Secretary and he returned to the backbenches. In October 2022, amid a government crisis, Truss appointed Shapps as Home Secretary, replacing Suella Braverman. His six-day tenure made Shapps the shortest-serving Home Secretary in British political history. After Rishi Sunak became Prime Minister, Shapps was demoted to Secretary of State for Business, Energy, and Industrial Strategy, succeeding Jacob Rees-Mogg. He was appointed Energy Security Secretary in February 2023.

Early life 
Shapps was born on 14 September 1968 in Croxley Green, Rickmansworth, Hertfordshire, the son of Beryl and Tony Shapps. His family is Jewish. Grant's brother, Andre Shapps, is a musician who was a member of Big Audio Dynamite (BAD) between 1994 and 1998, playing keyboards. Their cousin Mick Jones was a key figure in British punk rock of the late 1970s, and a founding member of both the Clash and Big Audio Dynamite.

Grant Shapps was educated at Yorke Mead Primary School, Watford Grammar School for Boys, where he achieved 5 'O' Levels, and at Cassio College in Watford, where he studied business and finance. He subsequently completed a business and finance course at Manchester Polytechnic, and received a Higher National Diploma.

Shapps was also National President of the Jewish youth organisation BBYO. In 1989, he was involved in a car crash in Kansas, United States, that left him in a coma for a week.

Business ventures 
Shapps started his working life as a photocopier sales rep. In 1990, aged 22, Shapps founded PrintHouse Corporation, a design, print, website creation and marketing business in London, based on a collapsed printing business he purchased from the receiver. He stepped down as a director in 2009, but remained the majority shareholder.

Shapps founded a web publishing business, How To Corp Limited, with his wife while he was recovering from cancer. The company marketed business publications and software. The existence of at least three people who allegedly provided testimonials for the company has been questioned. Shapps stood down as a director in July 2008; his wife remained as director until the company was dissolved in 2014.

In September 2012, Google blacklisted 19 of the Shapps' business websites for violating rules on copyright infringement related to the web scraping-based TrafficPayMaster software sold by them. Shapps's web marketing business's 20/20 Challenge publication also drew criticism. It cost $497 and promised customers earnings of $20,000 in 20 days. Upon purchase, the "toolkit" was revealed to be an ebook, advising the user to create their own toolkit and recruit 100 "Joint Venture Partners" to resell it for a share of the profits.

Shapps's use of the names Michael Green, Corinne Stockheath and Sebastian Fox attracted controversy in 2012. He denied having used a pseudonym after entering parliament and, in 2014, threatened legal action against a constituent who had stated on Facebook that he had. In February 2015, he publicly said: "I don't have a second job and have never had a second job while being an MP. End of story."

However, in March 2015, Shapps admitted to having had a second job while being an MP, and practising business under a pseudonym. In his admission, he stated that he had "over-firmly denied" having a second job. In March 2015, Dean Archer, the constituent previously threatened with legal action by Shapps, threatened Shapps with legal action.

Political career 

After deciding to go into politics, Shapps wrote to Watford Conservative MP Tristan Garel-Jones, who invited him to the House of Commons and gave Shapps advice. Shapps made his first foray into politics in 1990, when he was a Conservative candidate for a Labour-held seat in Old Moat ward on Manchester City Council. Shapps finished in a distant second place.

In 1994, Shapps stood as a Conservative candidate for the two-member St Andrews ward in the London Borough of Brent local elections, but was unsuccessful in being returned as a councillor, with Labour narrowly holding both seats.

Parliamentary candidacy 
Shapps unsuccessfully contested the seat of North Southwark and Bermondsey during the 1997 general election as the Conservative Party candidate.

Shapps stood for the Welwyn Hatfield constituency in the 2001 general election, again unsuccessfully. Shapps used the name Grant V Shapps in the 2001 and 2005 general elections, despite not having a middle name on his birth or marriage certificates, though in English law one may change one's name at any time without any formal procedures and this would not be recorded on existing certificates. He was reselected to fight Welwyn Hatfield in 2002 and continued his local campaigning over the next four years.

Member of Parliament 
Shapps stood again in the 2005 general election and was elected as the Conservative MP for Welwyn Hatfield, defeating the Labour MP and Minister for Public Health, Melanie Johnson. He received 22,172 votes (49.6%) and had a majority of 5,946 (13.3%), recording the second highest swing from Labour to Conservative in the election of 8.2%.

Shapps publicly backed David Cameron's bid for the leadership of the Conservative Party, seconding Cameron's nomination papers. Upon Cameron's election as party leader Shapps was appointed vice chairman of the Conservative Party with responsibility for campaigning.

He was a member of the Public Administration Select Committee between May 2005 and February 2007.

At the 2010 general election he was re-elected with an 11.1% swing and a majority of 17,423, taking 57% of the vote.

Shapps was opposed to the UK's withdrawal from the European Union prior to the 2016 referendum and voted Remain. However, following the referendum, Shapps announced he would support the result and vote to trigger Article 50. He also called on other Remain supporting MPs to do the same, arguing that voting down Article 50 to prevent Brexit would be "creating a situation which no-one wants be it MPs, voters or business" and that Parliament would contradict the fact it had granted the public a referendum on Britain's EU membership if it was not prepared to respect the result.

In October 2017, Shapps called for Theresa May's resignation, saying that the party could not "bury its head in the sand" in the wake of the June election. Shapps said that 30 MPs and "one or two" Cabinet ministers agreed with him that Theresa May should resign. May resigned two years later.

At the 2019 general election, Shapps was re-elected with a majority of 10,955, taking 52.6% of the vote.

Shadow Housing Minister 
In June 2007, Shapps became Shadow Minister for Housing and Planning, outside the Shadow Cabinet, but entitled to attend its meetings.

He was Shadow Housing Minister during the period of the last four Labour government housing ministers. During this period of opposition he argued in favour of a community-up approach to solving the housing crisis and warned against top-down Whitehall driven housing targets, which he believed had failed in the past.

In May 2008, Shapps was cited as one of several shadow ministers who had received cash from firms linked to their portfolios. The donors were originally recruited by Michael Gove who previously held the shadow housing portfolio. The Conservative Party said shadow ministers had not been influenced by donations. "Some Conservative policy on housing is actually against the policy of the donors", said a Conservative spokesman. Shadow ministers are allowed to receive donations from organisations covered by their brief as long as the person has a company in the UK or lives in the UK. The Commissioner exonerated all Shadow Cabinet members involved.

In April 2009, Shapps launched the Conservative Party's ninth green paper on policy, "Strong Foundations". In early 2010 Shapps published a series of six speeches in a pamphlet called "Home Truths".

Minister of State for Housing and Local Government 

In May 2010, Shapps became Minister of State for Housing and Local Government within the Communities and Local Government department and immediately repealed Home Information Pack (HIP) legislation. He chaired the Cross-Ministerial Working Group on Homelessness which includes ministers from eight Government departments. The group introduced 'No Second Night Out', a policy designed to prevent rough sleeping nationwide.

As Minister of State for Housing, Shapps promoted plans for flexible rent and controversially ended automatic lifetime social tenancies. He also introduced the New Homes Bonus which rewarded councils for building more homes. He denied claims that changes in Housing Benefit rules would be unfair claiming that ordinary people could no longer afford some of the homes paid for by the £24bn Housing Benefit bill. Shapps championed Tenant Panels.

At the 2011 party conference, Shapps backed the expansion of right to buy with the income being spent on replacing the sold housing with new affordable housing on a one for one basis.

In 2012, Shapps launched StreetLink – a website and phone app for the public to bring help to rough sleepers.

Conservative Party co-chairman 

In September 2012, Shapps was appointed Co-Chairman of the Conservative Party in Cameron's first major reshuffle. His salary was paid by the party. That November, Shapps hired political strategist Lynton Crosby to provide strategic advice and run the 2015 election campaign.

In March 2013, Shapps defended the Welfare Reform Act 2012 (often referred to as the "Bedroom Tax") saying his own children share a bedroom. That September, Shapps complained to the Secretary-General of the United Nations about a press release issued in its name stating that the reforms went against human rights. Also in 2013, Shapps speaking on benefit reforms including capping benefits so that no out-of-work household can claim more than the average working family earns said that "nearly a million people have come off incapacity benefit... before going for the test. They've taken themselves off. My big argument here is this is not these people were trying to play the system, as much as these people were forced into a system that played them." His statement was criticised by Andrew Dilnot, Chairman of the UK Statistics Authority, who said that the figure for those previously on incapacity and withdrawing was just 19,700. The other 878,300 not on benefits consisted of a drop in new claimants of the ESA.

In October 2013, Shapps told The Daily Telegraph that the BBC could forfeit the right to its licence fee if it did not resolve its "culture of waste and secrecy". He also suggested that the organisation was biased against the Conservative Party, saying it did not "apply fairness in both directions" and that there was a "question of credibility for the organisation". His comments sparked a vigorous response from a former BBC Director General Greg Dyke who said that "politicians shouldn't define partiality". Others, including the then BBC Director General Tony Hall echoed some of Shapps's comments by saying that the "BBC needs to start treating public money as its own".

In March 2014, Shapps tweeted support of the 2014 budget as supporting ordinary people. Opponents criticised Shapps of being patronising to working people by believing their pastimes were limited to bingo and beer, and it drew critical media coverage in The Guardian.

Shapps ceased to be co-chairman of the Conservative Party in May 2015.

Allegations regarding the editing of Wikipedia 
In 2012, The Guardian reported that Shapps's English Wikipedia article had been edited from his office to remove embarrassing information and correct an error. Shapps stated that he edited to make it more accurate. 

During the 2015 general election campaign, The Guardian reported allegations by a Wikipedia administrator that Shapps had used a sockpuppet account, Contribsx, to remove embarrassing material from his own English Wikipedia page and make "largely unflattering" edits to articles about other politicians, including some in his own party. Shapps denied the allegations; the Telegraph claimed his accuser was a "Liberal Democrat activist". English Wikipedia's Arbitration Committee found there was "no significant evidence" to link the Contribsx account to Shapps. The elected committee censured the administrator responsible for the allegation; for causing the investigation; for making false allegations to The Guardian; and for blocking the Contribsx account. Another administrator removed the block placed on the account.

Minister of State for International Development 
On 11 May 2015, Shapps was sacked from the Cabinet, which he had attended as Conservative Party co-chairman and Minister without portfolio at the Cabinet Office, and appointed as Minister of State at the Department for International Development. BBC political correspondent Chris Mason said the change appeared to be a demotion, while The Guardians chief political correspondent, Nicholas Watt, went further, calling it "a humiliating blow".

On 28 November 2015, Shapps stood down as minister of state due to allegations of bullying within the Conservative Party. It has been claimed that Shapps, in his previous role as party co-chairman, had ignored repeated allegations of bullying involving Mark Clarke, the then party youth organiser. Baroness Warsi, Shapps's predecessor as co-chair of the Conservative Party, had written to Shapps to raise concerns about Clarke's conduct in January 2015. Shapps had appointed Clarke to head his party's RoadTrip 2015 campaign in January 2015. Clarke denies all allegations.  The alleged bullying may have caused a young party member, Elliott Johnson, to commit suicide. The day before Shapps's resignation, Johnson's father had called on Shapps to step down and made the following comments:

OpenBrix allegations 
In August 2018, the Financial Times reported that it had discovered a "secret pay deal" between Shapps and OpenBrix, a British blockchain property portal company.  The story alleged that Shapps would have received a payment in cryptocurrency tokens with a future value of up to £700,000. Shapps resigned from OpenBrix and from his position as chairman of the all-party parliamentary group on blockchain which he had founded. Subsequently, Jo Platt, an opposition politician, called for an enquiry into Shapps' conduct, although Shapps maintained that he had confirmed with the standards commissioner that he was not required to register the interest, and that he had recorded the conversation with the relevant official.

Secretary of State for Transport 

Boris Johnson appointed Shapps Secretary of State for Transport upon his accession to Prime Minister. In the February 2020 cabinet reshuffle he retained this portfolio. He was given Cabinet responsibility for the Northern Powerhouse.

Thomas Cook Collapse
On 23 September 2019, Thomas Cook Group fell into administration, leaving more than 150,000 British tourists in need of repatriation. When asked why the Government chose not to bail out the company, Shapps said, "I fear it would have kept them afloat for a very short period of time and then we would have been back in the position of needing to repatriate people in any case."

General aviation
In October 2019, Shapps, a keen pilot, wrote to the Civil Aviation Authority (CAA), urging it to prioritise the protection of aerodromes and cut red tape for pilots. He was accused by Andy McDonald MP, shadow Transport Secretary, of "putting his hobbyhorse aviation ahead of the greater good" at a time when the CAA was involved in Brexit planning, Heathrow Airport expansion, and dealing with the collapse of Thomas Cook Group. He was later accused by MPs Sarah Olney (Liberal Democrat) and Grahame Morris (Labour) of undermining the CAA by registering his private, UK-based plane in the USA instead of the UK, while Transport Secretary. In 2021, The Times reported that the Airfield Advisory Team set up by Shapps within CAA lobbied against redevelopment of private airfields used by general aviation. The newspaper alleged that the team interferes with the government housing plans. He also set up a scheme, offering rebates to pilots who purchase anti-collision "electronic conspicuity" devices used to detect positions of other aircraft in the air.

Cycling
In May 2020, Shapps unveiled investment in cycle lanes totalling £250 million and plans for e-scooters to be trialled on British roads.

July 2022 Leadership bid

Shapps announced his campaign for leadership of the Conservative Party, following the resignation of Boris Johnson, on 9 July 2022. He withdrew from the race on 12 July, endorsing Rishi Sunak for leader.

Home Secretary 
Shapps was appointed Home Secretary on 19 October 2022 after the resignation of Suella Braverman. This occurred one day before Prime Minister Liz Truss announced her own resignation.

Business Secretary 
Shapps was appointed business secretary on 25 October 2022 by Rishi Sunak after the resignation of former business secretary Jacob Rees-Mogg. Suella Braverman replaced Shapps as Home Secretary.

Energy Secretary 

Following a cabinet reshuffle, Shapps was moved into the newly created portfolio of Secretary of State for Energy Security and Net Zero. Shapps' newly formed ministry had been formed from responsbilities taken from his previous role. He was the first holder of the role of Energy Secretary since Amber Rudd in 2016.

Personal life 
He married Belinda Goldstone in 1997, and the couple have three children. In 1999 Shapps was diagnosed with Hodgkin's lymphoma and underwent chemotherapy and radiotherapy recovering from cancer by the following year. As a result of the effects of chemotherapy, his children were conceived by IVF. Owing to his past cancer treatment, in February 2021 Shapps became the first UK Cabinet minister to receive a COVID-19 vaccine. He tested positive for COVID-19 in February 2022.

Shapps lists his recreations in Who's Who as "private pilot with IMC [Instrument Meteorological Conditions] and night qualifications".

Honours
 He was sworn in as a Member of Her Majesty's Most Honourable Privy Council on 21 July 2010 at Buckingham Palace, giving him the honorific title "The Right Honourable" for life.

References

Notes

External links 
 Grant Shapps MP Official constituency site
 

|-

|-

|-

|-

|-

|-

|-

|-

|-

1968 births
Living people
Jewish British politicians
English Jews
Alumni of Manchester Metropolitan University
Chairmen of the Conservative Party (UK)
Conservative Party (UK) MPs for English constituencies
Ministers of State for Housing (UK)
Members of the Privy Council of the United Kingdom
People educated at Watford Grammar School for Boys
People from Watford
People from Welwyn Hatfield (district)
UK MPs 2005–2010
UK MPs 2010–2015
UK MPs 2015–2017
UK MPs 2017–2019
UK MPs 2019–present
Secretaries of State for Transport (UK)
Secretaries of State for the Home Department